Timothy Eric McKnight is an American biologist. He has been a key developer of a cell transfecting method using vertically aligned carbon nanofibers.  Arrays of vertically aligned carbon nanofibers are modified with DNA and pressed into cells and tissue.  Surviving cells can express DNA that is delivered during the penetration event, even when the DNA is covalently bound to the penetrant nanofiber element.  This gene delivery technique has been termed Impalefection.

Selected publications

21st-century American biologists
Living people
Year of birth missing (living people)